The 1982 California lieutenant gubernatorial election was held on November 2, 1982. Democratic nominee Leo T. McCarthy defeated Republican nominee Carol Boyd Hallett with 52.21% of the vote.

Primary elections
Primary elections were held on June 8, 1982.

Democratic primary

Candidates
Leo T. McCarthy, State Assemblyman
Charles "Chuck" Pineda Jr.

Results

Republican primary

Candidates
Carol Boyd Hallett, State Assemblywoman
Marz J. Garcia, State Senator

Results

General election

Candidates
Major party candidates
Leo T. McCarthy, Democratic
Carol Boyd Hallett, Republican

Other candidates
John Vernon, Libertarian
Clyde Kuhn, Peace and Freedom
Houston Myers, American Independent

Results

References

California
1982
Lieutenant